HMCS Victoriaville was a  that served with the Royal Canadian Navy during the Second World War. She served primarily as a convoy escort in the Battle of the Atlantic. She was named for Victoriaville, Quebec. In 1966 she was converted to a diving tender and renamed Granby, serving as such until 1973 when she was decommissioned for the final time.

Victoriaville was ordered on 1 February 1943 as part of the 1943–1944 River-class building program. She was laid down on 2 December 1943 by George T. Davie Shipbuilding Ltd. at Lauzon, Quebec and launched 23 June 1944. She was commissioned into the Royal Canadian Navy on 11 November 1944 at Quebec City.

Background

The River-class frigate was designed by William Reed of Smith's Dock Company of South Bank-on-Tees. Originally called a "twin-screw corvette", its purpose was to improve on the convoy escort classes in service with the Royal Navy at the time, including the Flower-class corvette. The first orders were placed by the Royal Navy in 1940 and the vessels were named for rivers in the United Kingdom, giving name to the class. In Canada they were named for towns and cities though they kept the same designation. The name "frigate" was suggested by Vice-Admiral Percy Nelles of the Royal Canadian Navy and was adopted later that year.

Improvements over the corvette design included improved accommodation which was markedly better. For underwater targets, the River-class frigate was equipped with a Hedgehog anti-submarine mortar and depth charge rails aft and four side-mounted throwers.

River-class frigates were the first Royal Canadian Navy warships to carry the 147B Sword horizontal fan echo sonar transmitter in addition to the irregular ASDIC. This allowed the ship to maintain contact with targets even while firing unless a target was struck. Improved radar and direction-finding equipment improved the RCN's ability to find and track enemy submarines over the previous classes.

Canada originally ordered the construction of 33 frigates in October 1941. The design was too big for the shipyards on the Great Lakes so all the frigates built in Canada were built in dockyards along the west coast or along the St. Lawrence River. In all Canada ordered the construction of 60 frigates including ten for the Royal Navy that transferred two to the United States Navy.

Service history
After working up in Bermuda, Victoriaville was assigned to the Mid-Ocean Escort Force escort group C-9 in February 1945. She spent the rest of the war in Europe as a trans-Atlantic convoy escort. She returned to Canada in May 1945 and on 12 May escorted the surrendered  into Bay Bulls.

Later in May 1945, Victoriaville traveled to Saint John to undergo a tropicalization refit for possible service in the southern Pacific Ocean. This meant adding refrigeration and water-cooling capabilities and changing the camouflage. The refit was halted on 20 August 1945 and on 17 November that year, she was paid off at Sydney and laid up at Shelburne.

Postwar service
After the war Victoriaville was sold to Marine Industries Ltd. However, with the increasing Soviet submarine threat, the Royal Canadian Navy sought to augment its anti-submarine forces. She was reacquired and converted into a Prestonian-class frigate. This meant a flush-decked appearance aft, with a larger bridge and taller funnel. Her hull forward was strengthened against ice and the quarterdeck was enclosed to contain two Squid anti-submarine mortars. She emerged from the refit and was recommissioned into the Royal Canadian Navy on 25 September 1959 with the new pennant number 320. Victoriaville was assigned to the Seventh Canadian Escort Squadron.

Victoriaville served in an anti-submarine warfare role until 21 December 1966 when she was renamed Granby and was reclassified as a diving tender, taking over the name and role of the retiring , but kept her pennant number. She operated in this capacity until 31 December 1973 when she was paid off. She was sold for scrap in 1974.

Shag Harbour UFO incident
On the night of 4 October 1967 there was reported an impact of an unknown large object into waters near Shag Harbour, located in Barrington on Nova Scotia's South Shore. Seven navy divers from HMCS Granby conducted an underwater search until 8 October, when the search was cancelled. The Royal Canadian Navy reported nothing was found. The incident is known as the Shag Harbour UFO incident.

References

Notes

Sources
 
Macpherson, Ken; Burgess, John. The ships of Canada's naval forces 1910–1981 : a complete pictorial history of Canadian warships. Collins: Toronto, 1981. 
 https://www.saltwire.com/atlantic-canada/news/shag-harbour-ufo-incident-still-a-distinct-memory-for-many-after-51-years-228460/

 

River-class frigates of the Royal Canadian Navy
1944 ships
Ships built in Quebec